Kalli Landscape Conservation Area is a nature park is located in Saare County, Estonia.

Its area is 480 ha.

The protected area was founded in 2007 to protect representative fens and springs areas and adjacent natural and seminatural communities located in villages of Kalli, Kallemäe, Tõnija and Rannaküla.

References

Nature reserves in Estonia
Geography of Saare County